Joelson is both a given name and a surname. Notable people with the name include:

People with the given name
Joelson Santos Silva or Joelson (born 1980), Brazilian footballer
Joelson José Inácio (born 1983), Brazilian footballer

People with the surname
Charles Samuel Joelson (1916–1999), American lawyer and politician
Tsianina Joelson (born 1975), American actress and fitness model

See also
Jolson
Joel (disambiguation)